Christopher Borland (born December 26, 1990) is a former American football linebacker who played for the San Francisco 49ers of the National Football League (NFL). He played college football at Wisconsin, and was drafted by the 49ers in the third round of the 2014 NFL Draft. He is one of the first NFL players to retire from professional football early in his career due to concerns of mid-term brain damage possibly inherent to the sport.

Early years
Borland attended Archbishop Alter High School in Kettering, Ohio, where he was first-team All-state and All-conference player of the year. He was the team captain and MVP. He was a letterman in football, track, basketball and tennis. As a senior, he had 72 tackles, one interception, one forced fumble and two fumble recoveries on defense, and rushed for 1,230 yards and 19 touchdowns on offense.

In track & field, he was one of the state's top performers in the shot put. He placed fifth at the state meet in the shot put as a junior. At the 2008 Fairmont Firebird Invitational, he recorded a PR of 11.97 seconds in the 100 meters. He got a top-throw of 41.05 meters in the discus at the 2008 OHSAA District T&F Championships.

Recruiting
Regarded as a three-star recruit by Rivals.com, he was ranked the No. 55 linebacker nationally. He chose Wisconsin over scholarship offers from Iowa and Louisville.

College career

2009
Borland played in 13 games, starting six. He led the team with five forced fumbles and three fumble recoveries. He finished third on the team in tackles-for-loss (10.5) and sacks (5.0) and fifth in tackles (54). Borland also returned six kickoffs for 106 yards and made three extra points in the game against Hawaii. Borland was named the Big Ten's Freshman of the Year in 2009. He was also named to the FWAA Freshman All-American team.

2010
Borland played and started two games. He was injured in the second game of the season and missed the rest of the year with a shoulder injury. He was granted an injury redshirt for that season.

2011
Before the season, Borland was on the watchlist for the Butkus Award which is awarded to the nations best linebacker. He was also listed on the preseason watchlists for All-Big Ten, first-team by Phil Steele and second-team by Athlon.

On December 8, 2011, Borland was named Third-team All-American by Yahoo Sports. His teammate Russell Wilson joined him on the Third-team while Montee Ball was named to the First-team and offensive linemen Peter Konz and Kevin Zeitler were named to the Second-team.

2012

Borland set a season high with 13 tackles in the 2012 Big Ten Football Championship Game against Nebraska. He recorded a team-high 9 tackles in the 2013 Rose Bowl against Stanford. Following the season, Borland was named first-team All-Big Ten by the coaches and honorable mention by the media.

2013
Borland was named to the preseason watchlists for the Chuck Bednarik Award, Bronko Nagurski Trophy, Dick Butkus Award, Lombardi Award and Lott IMPACT Trophy. Halfway through the 2013 season ESPN ranked Chris Borland the #4 Defensive MVP.

On November 23, Borland tied the FBS career forced fumble record, with his 14th, against Minnesota. Also in late November, he was named one of four finalists for the Lott IMPACT Trophy. Other finalists include Anthony Barr (UCLA linebacker), Devon Kennard (USC defensive end) and James Morris (Iowa linebacker).

On December 3, 2013, Borland was named Big Ten Nagurski-Woodson Defensive Player of the Year Borland is the fifth Wisconsin player to be named Defensive Player of the Year, joining Troy Vincent (1991), Tom Burke (1998), Jamar Fletcher (2000) and Erasmus James (2004). Borland was also named the Big Ten's Butkus-Fitzgerald Linebacker of the Year.

On December 18, 2013, Borland was named to the first-team All-America Team by FWAA. He also earned second-team All-America honors by the AP, Athlon, CBS Sports, and Sports Illustrated.

College statistics

Source

Professional career

San Francisco 49ers
Borland was selected 77th overall in the 2014 NFL draft by the San Francisco 49ers. Throughout training camp and preseason, he competed against 49ers veteran Michael Wilhoite for a starting inside linebacker position left absent by the injured NaVorro Bowman.

In the last preseason game against the Houston Texans, Borland led the defense in tackles with six and returned an interception 34 yards for a touchdown.

Borland got his first career start in Week 7 against the Denver Broncos after the 49ers All-Pro ILB Patrick Willis injured his toe against the St. Louis Rams during week six. He led the 49ers defense with eight tackles, one tackle for loss and he recorded his first career sack against Peyton Manning. In his second start filling in for Willis, he recorded 18 tackles, 15 solo and three tackles for loss against the St. Louis Rams. His 18 tackles were the most tackles for a single player league-wide and included a "suplex-like" tackle of running back Tre Mason.

In a week 10 matchup against the New Orleans Saints, Borland recovered an overtime fumble that led the 49ers to a 27–24 victory. During the game, he recorded 17 tackles and he received his first ever NFL award, which was Pepsi NFL Rookie of the Week. In week 11, he was named NFC Defensive Player of the Week for his performance against the Eli Manning-led New York Giants where he was the first rookie linebacker in franchise history to get two interceptions in one game. He also led the team in tackles with 13 and had three passes defended. Borland was selected as the NFL's Defensive Rookie of the Month for November. On December 20, 2014, Borland was placed on season ending IR with an ankle injury.  He finished his rookie season with 108 tackles, one sack, and two interceptions, despite starting only 8 games.

On March 16, 2015, Borland announced his retirement from the NFL citing concern of head trauma. He received a $617,436 signing bonus when he inked a four-year rookie deal with the 49ers coming out of college but  would be returning approximately three-quarters of this bonus to the team, or about $463,077.

Professional statistics

Source

Awards and achievements

NFL
 Defensive Rookie of the Month (November 2014)
 NFC Defensive Player of the Week (Week 11, 2014)
 Pepsi NFL Rookie of the Week (Weeks 10 & 11, 2014)

College

 First-team All-America Team – FWAA (2013)
 3× First-team All-Big Ten (2011, 2012, 2013)
 Big Ten Defensive Player of the Year (2013)
 Big Ten Linebacker of the Year (2013)
 Third-team All-American – Yahoo Sports (2011)
 Big Ten Freshman of the Year (2009)
 FWAA Freshman All-America Team (2009)
 Honorable Mention All-Big Ten (2009)
 3× Big Ten Champion (2010, 2011, 2012)
 Division I FBS most fumbles forced, career (14)
 4× Big Ten Defensive Player of the Week (Weeks 10 & 12 – 2011, Week 4 – 2012, Week 11 2013)
Big Ten Conference Outstanding Sportsmanship Award (2014)
UW Student-Athlete of the Year (2014)

Life after football

Borland attended the premiere of GridIron Gladiators, directed by Todd Trigsted on April 19, 2015, in Portland, Oregon Borland has been outspoken about his decision to retire. He has received both praise and criticism for his assertions in many interviews, including one with CBS News in which he stated that he believes football as a whole to be "inherently dangerous".

In a December 2015 Frontline interview, Borland said, "Last year the NFL commissioned actuaries to estimate how many NFL veterans would have brain damage. And the number they came up with was three out of 10. So if I turn on a game, and a third of the guys will have brain damage in life, I just, I can't really support that. And, I don't really watch football anymore. If it's on, I may peek at it, but ..." He shook his head as the video faded.

Borland appeared in Episode 2 & 3 of the Netflix special three-part docuseries, Killer Inside: The Mind of Aaron Hernandez and discussed brain health in relation to football.

In 2018 he said that retiring early from football was very tough. After ESPN called him “the most dangerous man in football” for discussing the problem with concussions, he said that “I fell into a funk. I was trapped in a role I didn’t want. It was a hard couple of months.” In the same interview he said he works with the After the Impact Fund, which is a non-profit focused on helping veterans with PTSD and athletes with concussions.

References

External links

 Wisconsin profile

1990 births
Living people
American football linebackers
Wisconsin Badgers football players
San Francisco 49ers players
People from Kettering, Ohio
Players of American football from Ohio
All-American college football players